South Berwick is a census-designated place (CDP) and the primary village in the town of South Berwick, York County, Maine, United States. It is in southwestern York County, in the northwest corner of the town of South Berwick. It is bordered to the north by the town of Berwick, and to the southwest, across the Salmon Falls River, by the town of Rollinsford, New Hampshire.

Maine State Route 4 passes through the center of the village, leading north-northeast  to Sanford, and southwest across the Salmon Falls River, where New Hampshire Route 4 continues  to the city of Dover. State Route 236 leads northwest four miles to Berwick village and south  to Kittery. 

South Berwick was first listed as a CDP prior to the 2020 census.

Demographics

References 

Census-designated places in York County, Maine
Census-designated places in Maine
South Berwick, Maine